The 2006 NCAA Division I softball season, play of college softball in the United States organized by the National Collegiate Athletic Association (NCAA) at the Division I level, began in February 2006.  The season progressed through the regular season, many conference tournaments and championship series, and concluded with the 2006 NCAA Division I softball tournament and 2006 Women's College World Series.  The Women's College World Series, consisting of the eight remaining teams in the NCAA Tournament and held in held in Oklahoma City at ASA Hall of Fame Stadium, ended on June 6, 2006.

Conference standings

Women's College World Series
The 2006 NCAA Women's College World Series took place from June 1 to June 6, 2006 in Oklahoma City.

Season leaders
Batting
Batting average: .500 – Sarah Fekete, Tennessee Volunteers
RBIs: 82 – Melanie Denischuk, UMBC Retrievers & Ianeta Le'i, BYU Cougars
Home runs: 30 – Danyele Gomez, Louisiana Ragin' Cajuns

Pitching
Wins: 44-10 – Monica Abbott, Tennessee Volunteers softball
ERA: 0.41 (17 ER/286.0 IP) – Cat Osterman Texas Longhorns
Strikeouts: 630 – Cat Osterman Texas Longhorns

Records
NCAA Division I season grand slams:
6 – Serena Settlemier, Kansas Jayhawks

NCAA Division I season strikeout ratio:
15.4 (630 SO/286.0 IP) – Cat Osterman, Texas Longhorns

NCAA Division I 7 inning single game combined strikeouts:
34 – Katie Burkhart, Arizona State Sun Devils (15) & Danielle Lawrie, Washington Huskies (19); April 28, 2006

Sophomore class single game strikeouts:
26 – Angela Tincher, Virginia Tech Hokies; March 3, 2006

Freshman class strikeout ratio:
13.4 (221 SO/115.2 IP) – Cassie Cervantes, Sacramento State Hornets

Junior class triples:
14 – Marci Pratt, Southern Utah Thunderbirds

Senior class WHIP:
0.42 (78 H+43 BB/286.0 IP) – Cat Osterman, Texas Longhorns

Awards
USA Softball Collegiate Player of the Year:
Cat Osterman, Texas Longhorns

Honda Sports Award Softball:
Cat Osterman, Texas Longhorns

Best Female College Athlete ESPY Award
Cat Osterman, Texas Longhorns

All America Teams
The following players were members of the All-American Teams.

First Team

Second Team

Third Team

References

External links